Lee Da-yeong (born ) is a South Korean female volleyball player who currently plays as a setter for the South Korea women's national volleyball team. She is the twin sister of Lee Jae-yeong, who was also a member of the South Korea national Volleyball team.

Career 
Lee Da-yeong started her international career similarly to her twin sister and they have played together in several international events for the national team, including the 2014 Asian Games held in South Korea, at which they clinched the gold medal. Other tournaments at which they have competed in together include the 2018 FIVB Volleyball Women's Nations League, the 2018 Asian Games, and the 2019 FIVB Volleyball Women's World Cup in September 2019.

Personal life
Lee Da-yeong was born on 15 October 1996 as one of twin daughters to Kim Gyeong-hui and Lee Ju-hyeong. Her mother is Kim Gyeong-hui who played as a setter for the South Korea women's national volleyball team at the 1988 Summer Olympics.

Lee studied in the Jeonju Jungsan Elementary School, the Jinju Gyeonghae Girls' Middle School and the Jinju Sunmyung Girls' High School. Her twin sister Lee Jae-yeong is also a national volleyball player.

The sisters were both suspended indefinitely by their club after being anonymously accused of bullying online. They have however claimed that many of the bullying accusations made towards them were false, and plan on taking legal action against the anonymous author of the online post.

Lee married her then-husband in April of 2018, after 3 months of dating. The pair separated shortly after due to the verbal abuse suffered by the husband from Lee. The pair have since settled on a legal divorce in 2021.

Clubs
  Suwon Hyundai Engineering & Construction Hillstate (2014–2020)
  Incheon Heungkuk Life Pink Spiders (2020–2021)
  PAOK Thessaloniki (2021–2022)
  CS Rapid București (2022–)

Awards

Individual
 2014 Asian Junior Championship "Best Setter"
 2014-2015 Korean V-League - "All-Star Game Ceremony"
 2015-2016 Korean V-League - "Best Dresser"
 2015-2016 Korean V-League - "All-Star Game Ceremony"
 2017-2018 Korean V-League - "Round 1 MVP"
 2017-2018 Korean V-League - "All-Star Game MVP"
 2017-2018 Korean V-League - "Best 7 - Setter"
 2018-2019 Korean V-League - "Best 7 - Setter"
 2019-2020 Korean V-League - "Round 3 MVP"
 2019-2020 Korean V-League - "Best 7 - Setter"
 2021-2022 Greek Championship - "Round 3 MVP"

National team
 2013 The 17th Asian Women's Volleyball Championship -  Bronze Medal
 2014 The 17th Asian JR. Women's Volleyball Championship -  Bronze Medal
 2014 The 4th Asian Women's Cup Volleyball Championship -  Silver medal
 2014 The 17th Incheon Asian Games -  Gold Medal
 2018 The 18th Jakarta-Palembang Asian Games -  Bronze Medal

Clubs
 2015-2016 Korean V-League -  Champion, with Suwon Hyundai Engineering & Construction Hillstate

References

External links 

 

1996 births
Living people
South Korean women's volleyball players
Volleyball players at the 2014 Asian Games
Volleyball players at the 2018 Asian Games
Asian Games gold medalists for South Korea
Asian Games bronze medalists for South Korea
Medalists at the 2014 Asian Games
Medalists at the 2018 Asian Games
Asian Games medalists in volleyball
Twin sportspeople
People from Jeonju
Sportspeople from North Jeolla Province